Crossidius is a genus of beetles in the family Cerambycidae. 

Containing the following species:

 Crossidius ater LeConte, 1861
 Crossidius coralinus LeConte, 1862
 Crossidius discoideus (Say, 1824)
 Crossidius grahami Morris & Wappes, 2013
 Crossidius hirtipes LeConte, 1854
 Crossidius humeralis LeConte, 1858
 Crossidius hurdi Chemsak & Linsley, 1959
 Crossidius mexicanus Chemsak & Noguera, 1997
 Crossidius militaris Bates, 1892
 Crossidius mojavensis Linsley, 1955
 Crossidius pulchellus LeConte, 1861
 Crossidius punctatus LeConte, 1873
 Crossidius suturalis LeConte, 1858
 Crossidius testaceus LeConte, 1851

References

Trachyderini
Cerambycidae genera